S. Sivadas (b. 1940) is an Indian children's writer in Malayalam. He is the author of around 200 books which include popular science, contemporary ecology, short stories, novels and other fictional stories with an emphasis on scientific outlook. He was a chemistry professor at CMS College Kottayam. He is a three-time recipient of the Kerala Sahitya Akademi Award.

Biography
Sivadas was born on 19 February 1940 in Ullala village near Vaikom in Kottayam district of Kerala. He was a professor at CMS College Kottayam from 1962 to 1995. He was the founder secretary of the Kottayam district committee of Kerala Sasthra Sahithya Parishad. He edited the Malayalam magazines Eureka, Sasthra Keralam, Balasastram, Engane Engane and Labour India. He also served as the chairman of Parishad's publication division, consulting editor of Sarvavijnanakosam, and the chairman of the Chemistry Post Graduate Board of Studies at Mahatma Gandhi University.

Awards
 1974: Kerala Sahitya Akademi Award for Children's Literature – Rasatantra Kathakal
 1997: Kerala Sahitya Akademi Award for Travelogue – Munichile Sundarikalum Sundaranmarum
 2000: Kerala State Institute of Children's Literature's C. G. Santhakumar_Award – Overall contribution
 2007: Kerala Sahitya Akademi Award for Children's Literature – Pustaka Kalikal
 2015: Kendra Sahitya Akademi Award for Children's Literature – Overall contribution
 2014: P. T. Bhaskara Panicker Emeritus Fellowship
 2021: Tata Trusts's Big Little Book Award – Overall contribution

Selected works

Niagara Muthal Sahara Vare
Carbon Enna Mantrikan
Jayikkan Padikkam
Sastra Kalikal
Kadankathakal Kondu Kalikkam
Puthiya Sastra Viseshangal
Padikkan Padikkam
Bau Bau Kathakal
Ningalude Makkale Engane Midukkanmarakkam
Kanjeem Cureem Kalikkam
Kuttikalude Science Projectukal
Padana Projectukal: Oru Vazhikatti
Sasyalokam Albuthalokam
Pustaka Kalikal
Kuttikalkk Moonnu Natakangal
Keeyo Keeyo
Munichile Sundarikalum Sundaranmarum
Ganitavum Sastravum Padikkendathengane
Mathan Mannira Case
Galileo
Pustaka Malakhayude Katha
Kuttikalude Science Kit
Nani Ammayude Aduppu
Swargathinte Thakkol
101 Sastra Lekhanangal
Aara Mama Ee Viswanammavan
Oru Bhranthan Kandalinte Kathu
Rasatantra Sagaram
Rasatantra Kathakal
Prakriti Ammayude Albutha Lokathil
Koottaymayude Suvisesham
Vayichalum Vayichalum Teeratha Pustakam
Orayiram Kokkukalum Oru Santhipravum
Valarunna Sastram
Oru Madhura Mambazhakatha
Randu Kantharikuttikal Agniparvathathil
Manya Madam Curie Aya Katha
Sachinum Koottarum Padipicha Vijaya Mantrangal

References

1940 births
Malayali people
Malayalam-language writers
Living people
Indian children's writers
Recipients of the Kerala Sahitya Akademi Award
Writers from Kottayam
20th-century Indian male writers
21st-century Indian male writers